Events in the year 1959 in Israel.

Incumbents
 Prime Minister of Israel – David Ben-Gurion (Mapai)
 President of Israel – Yitzhak Ben-Zvi
 President of the Supreme Court – Yitzhak Olshan
 Chief of General Staff - Haim Laskov
 Government of Israel - 8th Government of Israel until 17 December, 9th Government of Israel

Events

 8 January – Four Egyptian MiG-17 jets penetrated Israeli airspace near Beersheba before being driven off by Israeli fighters.
 1 April – The "Night of the Ducks" scandal: A surprise Israeli military exercise to test the mobilization of the IDF's reserves causes panic throughout Israel and puts the armies of the neighboring Arab states on high alert.
 7 April – Israel created the first Holocaust Memorial Day by vote of the Knesset in Tel Aviv, to be observed on the 27th day of Nisan, which fell on 5 May in 1959. If the 27th falls on a Friday, the observation is held on the 26th.
 5 July – David Ben-Gurion resigned as Prime Minister of Israel and new elections were called for the Knesset.
 9 July – The Wadi Salib riots begin in Haifa.
 10 July – A memorial for Frank Foley (1884–1958) was dedicated in Harel, Israel, in the form of a forest planted in the desert. As a passport control officer at Britain's embassy in Nazi Germany, Foley flouted strict rules in order to help as many as 10,000 German Jews to leave the country.
 6 October – The Carmelit, Haifa's underground funicular railway, is opened.
 3 November – Mapai leader David Ben-Gurion wins the fourth Israeli legislative elections, capturing 47 of the 120 seats, but still 13 short of a majority. 
 4 November – Six Israeli jets and four Egyptian MiG-17s clashed in a dogfight near the border between the two nations. All planes reportedly returned safely and the battle did not lead to further action.
 17 December – David Ben-Gurion presents his cabinet for a Knesset "Vote of Confidence". The 9th Government is approved that day and the members were sworn in.

Israeli–Palestinian conflict 
The most prominent events related to the Israeli–Palestinian conflict which occurred during 1959 include:

Notable Palestinian militant operations against Israeli targets

The most prominent Palestinian fedayeen terror attacks committed against Israeli targets during 1959 include:

 1 February – Three Israeli civilians are killed by a terrorist landmine near moshav Zavdiel.
 15 April – An Israeli guard is killed at kibbutz Ramat Rachel.
 27 April – Two Israeli hikers are shot at close range and killed near Masada.
 3 October – A shepherd from kibbutz Heftziba is killed near kibbutz Yad Hana.

Notable Israeli military operations against Palestinian militancy targets

The most prominent Israeli military counter-terrorism operations (military campaigns and military operations) carried out against Palestinian militants during 1959 include:

Births
 9 April – Hanny Nahmias, actress and entertainer.
 19 July – Yehuda Meshi Zahav, Haredi social activist, founder of ZAKA (died 2022).

Deaths
 28 January – Yosef Sprinzak (born 1885), Russian-born leading Zionist activist, an Israeli politician and the first Speaker of the Knesset.
 20 February – Zalman Shneur (born 1887), Russian (Belarus)-born Israeli poet and writer
 25 February – Yehudah Arazi (born 1907), Russian (Poland)-born leading Haganah commander.
 25 February – Eliyahu Berligne (born 1866), Russian-born early Zionist leader and a founder of Tel Aviv.
 26 February – Selig Suskin (born 1873), Russian-born Israeli agronomist and early Zionist.
 6 April – Leo Aryeh Mayer (born 1895), Austro-Hungarian (Galicia)-born Israeli scholar of Islamic art and rector of the Hebrew University of Jerusalem.
 25 July – Rabbi Yitzhak HaLevi Herzog (born 1888), Russian (Poland)-born Chief Rabbi of Ireland, Ashkenazi Chief Rabbi of the British Mandate of Palestine and of Israel.
 13 September – Israel Rokach (born 1896), Israeli politician, Knesset member, and mayor of Tel Aviv.
 Full date unknown – Shimon Fritz Bodenheimer - (born 1897) German-born Israeli biologist and zoologist.

Major public holidays

See also
 1959 in Israeli film
 1959 in Israeli music
 1959 in Israeli sport

References

External links